Hans Kronold (3 July 1872 in Kraków – 10 January 1922 in New York City) was a Jewish-born Polish cellist, composer, educator, and a member of symphony orchestras of New York and Boston. He was the first cellist to have his work recorded on audio, which he did for recording pioneer Gianni Bettini phonograph cylinders in the 1890s.

Life and career
Kronold was born in Kraków to Adolph Kronold and Louise (Hirschberg) Kronold. His sister was the opera soprano Selma Kronold; a cousin of Polish pianist and composer Moritz Moszkowski. He had his first musical training in Leipzig, where he studied with Max Kiesling (1866-1930). He lived in Berlin for three years, where he extended his musical education with Professor Richard Vollrath, and piano and harmony with Hans Rasch. In 1886, he emigrated to New York, resuming his studies with cellist Anton Hekking, and S. Vreeman.

Kronold soon joined the Metropolitan Opera and shortly after the New York Symphony Orchestra, where he played for five consecutive seasons. In 1894, he married Rose Fischel and had two daughter, Nora and Sophie Kronold. From 1900, he toured the United States and Canada for five years under the direction of Walter Damrosch, accompanying not only singers and acclaimed violinists such as Maud Powell, but also other renowned instrumentalists of his time. On his return, he quit playing for orchestras and devoted himself to solo-playing and teaching at the New York College of Music. He died in New York on 10 January 1922.

Kronold made a number of 78 RPMs and phonograph cylinder recordings for Columbia Records, and the Thomas A. Edison, Inc., publishing his compositions for cello and piano, violin and piano, and other songs through leading publishing houses such as the Oliver Ditson Company, Carl Fischer Music, and M. Witmark & Sons.

Recordings

Cello solo with piano
Note: The grey cells in the tables indicate that there is no opus number, name or composer. The m-dashe cells indicate that there is an opus number, name or composer, but that they are currently missing.

Violin solo with piano

Cello solo with orchestra

Compositions

Notes

References

External links
 Collected Works of Hans Kronold at Archive.org
 Titel von 'Kronold, Hans' by Henry König

1872 births
1922 deaths
New York College of Music faculty
Polish Austro-Hungarians
American classical cellists
Polish emigrants to the United States